The 2011–12 Druga HNL (also known as 2. HNL) was the 21st season of Croatia's second level football competition since its establishment in 1992. HNK Gorica were league champions and earned a place in Croatia's first division, which was later denied after getting their top level license revoked. Second placed NK Lučko were the only promoted team at the end of the previous season. The competition started on 19 August 2011 and ended on 20 May 2012.

Format
The league was contested by 15 teams (one less than in the previous season). Only Lučko were granted top level license, Gorica's license was revoked after appeal from Istra 1961. Third placed Pomorac unsuccessfully tried to obtain it through arbitration. Only two teams from Treća HNL were granted license for competing in the Druga HNL, but only Radnik Sesvete was promoted as Segesta didn't finish the season within top five places.

Changes from last season
The following clubs have been promoted or relegated at the end of the 2010–11 season:

From 2. HNL
Promoted to 1. HNL
 Lučko (2nd place)

Relegated to 3. HNL
 Vukovar '91 (15th place)
 Suhopolje (16th place)

To 2. HNL
Relegated from 1. HNL
 Hrvatski Dragovoljac (16th place)

Promoted from 3. HNL
 Radnik Sesvete (3. HNL West winners)

Clubs

League table

Results

Top goalscorers
The top scorers in the 2011–12 Druga HNL season were:

See also
2011–12 Prva HNL
2011–12 Croatian Cup

References

External links
Official website  

First Football League (Croatia) seasons
2
Croa